Maddy may refer to:

People
 Maddy (given name) (also a common nickname and diminutive), alternatively spelled Maddie
 diminutive of Madeleine (name)
 diminutive of Madison (name)
 diminutive of Maddison
 Maddy (surname)
 R. Maddy, nickname of R. Madhavan (born 1970), Indian film actor

Places
 Loch Maddy, North Uist, Outer Hebrides, Scotland, UK; a sea loch; see List of bays of the Outer Hebrides#Loch Maddy

Other uses
 , an unbuilt WWII Loch-class frigate
 SS Loch Maddy (sunk 1940), see List of shipwrecks in February 1940
 SS Empire Trail (launched 1943), named "Loch Maddy" 1951–1960; see List of Empire ships (Th–Ty)#Empire Trail

See also

 
 Maidie Norman (1912–1998), African-American actress
 Madi (disambiguation)
 Madhi (disambiguation)
 Mahdi (disambiguation)
 Maddi (disambiguation)

 Madie (disambiguation)
 Mady

 Madison (disambiguation)
 Madeleine (disambiguation)